Notoamides are bio-active isolates of marine Aspergillus.

References

Alkaloids
Diketopiperazines